The Embassy of Equatorial Guinea in London was the diplomatic mission of Equatorial Guinea in the United Kingdom.

In 2021 the Equatoguinean government announced this embassy will close. This was in response to the UK government sanctioning Teodoro Obiang Mangue, the vice-president and son of the president of the country, accusing him of misappropriating money. Soon afterwards, the embassy was closed.

Gallery

References

Diplomatic missions in London
Diplomatic missions of Equatorial Guinea
Equatorial Guinea
Equatorial Guinea–United Kingdom relations
St James's